Kara Tucina Olidge, Ph.D. (January 10, New Orleans, Louisiana) is a scholar, arts and educational administrator and the executive director of the Amistad Research Center at Tulane University. The Amistad Research Center is the nation's oldest, largest and most comprehensive independent archive specializing in the history of African Americans and other ethnic minorities. Prior to this position, she was the deputy director of the Schomburg Center for Research in Black Culture, a branch of the New York Public Library based in Harlem. The Schomburg is one of the world's leading research facilities dedicated to the history of the African diaspora. Prior to joining the Schomburg in 2012, Olidge was the director of the Hetrick-Martin Institute, a nonprofit organization serving lesbian, gay, bisexual and transgender youth in Newark, NJ. Olidge specializes in art and educational administration and leadership and has led educational institutions and community-based organizations.

Olidge's scholarly work has focused on critical cosmopolitanism, identity and cultural activism within communities of color. She has taught at the State University of New York at Buffalo, Medaille College, and the Arts Council of New Orleans' Urban Arts Training Program. She has been invited to conferences and panels to discuss her expertise on art and cultural activism, homophobia, racialized identities and curatorial work. She has curated art exhibits for emerging artists of color and given lectures on the intersection of arts and activism and arts-centered literacy.

Academic Background
Born in New Orleans, Olidge completed her education studies with a regents diploma and was a recipient of the Coca-Cola Scholars Foundation "I Have a Dream" Scholarship. She graduated from Spelman College in 1992 with a bachelor's degree in Philosophy with a minor in Art History. During her time at Spelman, she began her educational work as a library principal assistant in Atlanta, Georgia at the Atlanta-Fulton Public Library System where she assisted the community in enhancing literacy skills.

She received a Master of Arts in Arts Administration from the University of New Orleans in 2000 and was selected as a Marcus B. Christian Graduate Scholarship recipient. Her thesis, "Stella Jones Gallery: Organizational Analysis and Suggested Marketing Plan" analyzed the organizational structure and cultures of Stella Jones Gallery as it relates to her internship as Managing Director, and she developed a marketing plan to support, expose, and expand the mission of the organization. During her time in graduate school, she became involved in the arts community in New Orleans, including becoming the director of education for the Shakespeare Festival at Tulane University, the Gallery Manager at the Stella Jones Gallery and the Visual Art Curator at The Amistad Research Center at Tulane.

After moving to Buffalo, New York in 2000, she continued her work in the arts and community activism. She received her Ph.D. in Educational Leadership and Policy at The State University of New York at Buffalo in 2010, and received the Mark Diamond Research Grant for her doctoral work. Her dissertation, "Critical cosmopolitanism and the intellectual work of Alain Locke" explored how Alain Locke's educational experiences and sexuality influenced his deployment of critical cosmopolitanism in his work as a Negro educator and cultural activist. In contrast to arguments by Nathan Huggins and Henry Louis Gates Jr. that Locke was an elite integrationist, Olidge's research characterizes Locke as an educator and cultural activist whose lifework was to dismantle racial inequality.

Educational and Arts Administrative Experience
Before joining the Schomburg Center for Research in Black Culture, Olidge developed programming and directed the pilot site Hetrick-Martin Institute in Newark, NJ. While working on her Ph.D. at the State University of New York at Buffalo, she was the Program Director of Community and College Connections at the Educational Opportunity Center at the university, the Senior Program Office of Good Schools for All at the Community Foundation for Greater Buffalo and the Advanced Technology Training and Information Networking (ATTAIN) Lab Site Supervisor and Manager at the State University of New York at Buffalo Center for Academic and Workforce Development.

Professional Affiliations and Community Service
Olidge served on the Queer Newark Oral History Project Committee with co-chair, Darnell L. Moore. For two years, she has been a member of the Essex County Lesbian, Gay, Bisexual, Transgender and Questioning Advisory Board, the first county-level board of its kind in New Jersey, and the finance chair of the Newark-Essex Pride Coalition. The Coalition organizes Newark LGBT Pride events.

She was recently appointed a board member of CLAGS: The Center for LGBTQ Studies. CLAGS is a 501(c)3 organization under the City University of New York and is housed at CUNY's Graduate Center. The CLAGS working Board of Directors is a diverse group of LGBTQ activists, artists, and scholars, and others who identify or work full-time with community-based organizations. Board members join two of CLAGS committees and are actively involved in the ongoing activities of the organization.

She was previously the Board Development Committee Chair and the Planning Committee Co-Chair at the Hallwalls Contemporary Arts Center between 2008-2010.

References

External links
 The Schomburg Center for Research in Black Culture.
 Olidge is referenced in the book, Multicultural Education Policies in Canada and the United States,  by Reva Joshee and Lauri Johnson. UBC Press, The University of British Columbia, Vancouver, BC, 2007.
 Olidge's doctoral dissertation referenced in the Journal of American History's Recent African American Scholarship.
National Arts Administration Mentorship Program. Report to the Field: A Record and Reflection of Value-based Learning, Caron Atlas and Kathie deNobriga. N. 2002.

Living people
People from New Orleans
African-American academics
American anti-racism activists
Year of birth missing (living people)
21st-century African-American people